Rüdiger Vollborn (born 12 February 1963) is a German retired footballer who played as a goalkeeper.

During a 17-year professional career he played solely for Bayer Leverkusen, appearing in a total of 401 Bundesliga games.

See also 
 List of one-club men

External links

References 

1963 births
Living people
Footballers from Berlin
German footballers
Association football goalkeepers
Bundesliga players
Bayer 04 Leverkusen players
Germany under-21 international footballers
UEFA Cup winning players
West German footballers